The Mid-South Louisiana Heavyweight Championship was a secondary professional wrestling championship that was used and defended from 1964 though 1983. Initially, the championship originated in the NWA affiliated Gulf Coast Championship Wrestling. During this time, it was referred to as the NWA Gulf Coast Louisiana Heavyweight Championship until 1972. Beginning in '72, the title was used in the NWA affiliated NWA Tri-State then was called the NWA Tri-State Louisiana Heavyweight Championship from 1972 until 1979. In 1979, however, wrestler and promoter "Cowboy" Bill Watts purchased the Tri-State territory and renamed it Mid-South Wrestling Association. Although Watts kept close ties with the NWA for purpose of having access to wrestling talent, he withdrew Mid-South from the NWA and, as a result, renamed all of the promotion's championships accordingly.

Title history
Silver areas in the history indicate periods of unknown lineage.

See also
Universal Wrestling Federation

References

External links
Louisiana Heavyweight title history

Mid-South Wrestling championships
State professional wrestling championships
Professional wrestling in Louisiana